This is a list of British place names that commemorate non-Christian religions. Many of them refer to the old Germanic religion. There are 3 types of such names:
Places named after gods.
Places named after temples.
Places named after men with theophoric names, such as Thurlstone = "Thor-wolf's farmstead"; but none are listed here yet.

Note that the common English place name Thorley came from "Thorn-ley".

 Cold Higham 
 Harrow on the Hill
 Harrow, London
 Harrowden, Bedfordshire
 Kirkharle
 List of places named after Wodanaz 
 Peper Harow
 Roseberry Topping
 Tewin
 Therfield
 Thoresway
 Thundersley
 Thundridge
 Thursby
 Tuesley
 Thursley
 Tysoe
 Wednesbury
 Wednesfield
 Weedon Bec
 Weedon Lois
 Weedon, Buckinghamshire
 Weeford
 Weeley
 Weoley Castle
 Weyhill
 Wing, Buckinghamshire
 Wingrave
 Wye, Kent

Religious places
Religious
Religion in the United Kingdom
Religious